MELCOR is a fully integrated, engineering-level computer code developed by Sandia National Laboratories for the U.S. Nuclear Regulatory Commission to model  the progression of severe accidents in nuclear power plants. A broad spectrum of severe accident phenomena in both boiling and pressurized water reactors is treated in MELCOR in a unified framework. MELCOR applications include estimation of severe accident source terms, and their sensitivities and uncertainties in a variety of applications.

See also
 Nuclear engineering
 Monte Carlo method
 Nuclear reactor
 MCNP

External links
 SNL MELCOR website
 NRC "Obtaining MELCOR" site
 Wikiversity: Nuclear Engineering

Nuclear safety and security
Physics software